Cynthia Mana Pettice Strandell (born 8 September 1946), known professionally as Cyndee Peters, is an American–Swedish gospel singer and author in Sweden. She was born in 1946 in Granite Falls, North Carolina.

In addition to featuring in TV shows and concerts, she has also written two books:
 Timme för Timme, dag för dag (1988); 2nd edition 2005
 Vidare (1994)

In 1987 she came third in the Melodifestivalen, the Swedish selection for the Eurovision Song Contest, with the song När morgonstjärnan brinner.

Over the years she has worked with many artists, including Liza Minnelli and Natalie Cole. She lived in the Swedish town of Sollentuna for many years until moving back to the US in 2011. In 2004 she became an honorary member of the Swedish organisation Vasa Order of America.

References

External links
Cyndee Peters Official Website. Retrieved 22 April 2008.

1946 births
Living people
African-American women singers
American women singers
Swedish women singers
Swedish people of African-American descent
American emigrants to Sweden
People from Granite Falls, North Carolina
Recipients of the Order of Vasa
Swedish gospel singers
Melodifestivalen contestants of 1987